The Springfield Three refers to an unsolved missing persons case that began on June 7, 1992, when friends Suzanne "Suzie" Streeter and Stacy McCall, and Streeter's mother, Sherrill Levitt, went missing from Levitt's home in Springfield, Missouri, United States. All of their personal belongings, including cars and purses, were left behind. There were no signs of a struggle except a broken porch light globe; there was also a message on the answering machine that police believe might have provided a clue about the disappearances, but it was inadvertently erased.

In 1997, Robert Craig Cox, a convicted kidnapper and robber, claimed that he knew the women had been murdered and that their bodies would never be recovered. Neither their whereabouts nor their remains have ever been discovered. No investigators in the case believe Cox has any credibility.

Victims
Sherrill Elizabeth Levitt was age 47 at the time of her disappearance. She was a cosmetologist at a local salon, and was a single mother described as being very close to her daughter, Suzanne Elizabeth "Suzie" Streeter. Her distinguishable marks included a scar on her upper right forearm, a small mole on the left corner of her mouth, and pierced ears (left ear pierced twice).

Disappearance
Streeter and McCall graduated from Kickapoo High School on June 6, 1992. They were last seen at around 2:00 a.m. on June 7, when they were leaving the last of the few graduation parties they had attended that evening. At some point during the night, they were also seen in Battlefield. The pair planned to spend the night at their friend Janelle Kirby's house, but when they decided Kirby's house was too crowded, they instead left to go to Streeter's (and thus Levitt's) home at 1717 East Delmar Street to retire for the night. It is assumed they arrived, because their clothing, jewelry, purses and vehicles were all present at the house the next day. Levitt was last heard from at approximately 11:15 p.m. on June 6 when she spoke with a friend on the phone about painting an armoire.

The following day around 9 a.m., Kirby and her boyfriend visited the house after Streeter and McCall failed to show up at her home; they had planned to spend the day at a water park, and were supposed to leave from Kirby's residence. Upon arriving, Kirby found the home's front door unlocked and entered the home, but found no sign of Streeter, McCall, or Levitt; each of the women's cars were parked outside. She also reported to police that the glass lamp shade on the porch light was shattered, though the lightbulb itself was intact. Kirby's boyfriend innocently helped her sweep the broken glass off the porch, which police later determined may have destroyed potential evidence. Inside the house, Kirby found Levitt and Streeter's dog, a Yorkshire Terrier named Cinnamon, who appeared agitated; while inside, Kirby also answered a "strange and disturbing call" from an unidentified male who made "sexual innuendos". She hung up and immediately received another call of a sexual nature, again hanging up the phone.

Several hours later, McCall's mother, Janis, also visited the house after failed attempts to reach her daughter by phone. Inside, she noticed all three women's purses were sitting on the floor of the living room, and also saw her daughter's clothing neatly folded from the night before. Levitt and Streeter's cigarettes were also left inside the house. Janis frantically called police from the home's telephone to report the three women missing; after placing the call, while checking the phone's answering machine, she listened to a "strange message", but it was inadvertently erased from the tape. Police were "very interested" in the call and believed it "may have contained a clue". They also did not believe it was connected to the prank calls Kirby received.

McCall's parents contacted police in reference to their daughter's disappearance from Levitt's home more than sixteen hours after the women were last seen, and other worried friends and family called and visited the home the following day. Police later estimated that the crime scene had been corrupted by ten to twenty people who visited Levitt's house. Upon the officers' arrival, the scene showed no signs of a struggle, except for the shattered porch light. Police also noted Levitt's bed had been slept in. All personal property was left behind including purses, money, cars, keys, cigarettes, and the family dog.

Later developments
On December 31, 1992, a man called the America's Most Wanted hotline with information about the women's disappearances, but the call was disconnected when the switchboard operator attempted to link up with Springfield investigators. Police said the caller had "prime knowledge of the abductions" and publicly appealed for the man to contact them, but he never did. Levitt and Streeter were declared legally dead in 1997. However, their case files are still officially filed under "missing".

Investigators received a tip that the women's bodies were buried in the foundations of the south parking garage at Cox Hospital. In 2007, crime reporter Kathee Baird invited Rick Norland, a mechanical engineer, to scan a corner of the parking garage with ground-penetrating radar (GPR). Norland found three anomalies "roughly the same size" that he said were consistent with a "grave site location"; two of the anomalies were parallel, and the other was perpendicular. Springfield Police Department (SPD) spokesperson Lisa Cox said that the person who reported the tip "provided no evidence or logical reasoning behind this theory at that time or since then." She also said the parking garage began construction in September 1993, over a year after the disappearances. "Digging up the area and subsequently reconstructing this structure would be extremely costly, and without any reasonable belief that the bodies could be located here, it is illogical to do so, and for those reasons SPD does not intend to. Investigators have determined this lead to not be credible." Darrell Moore, a former assistant at the Greene County Prosecutor's Office, said the tip came from someone who either "claimed to be a psychic or claimed to have a dream or vision about the case".

Suspect
In 1997, Robert Craig Cox, imprisoned in Texas as a convicted kidnapper and robber, and the suspect in a Florida murder, told journalists that he knew the three women had been murdered and buried and claimed their bodies would never be recovered. In 1992, Cox had been living in Springfield and, when interviewed then, had told investigators that he was with his girlfriend at church the morning after the women disappeared, which she corroborated. However, she later recanted her statement and said that Cox had asked her to say that. Cox also stated that he was at the home of his parents the night of the disappearance, and they confirmed that alibi. Authorities were uncertain if Cox was involved in the case or if he was seeking recognition for the alleged murders by issuing false statements. Cox stated to authorities and journalists he would disclose what happened to the three women after his mother died.

In media
The case remains unsolved as of 2023, in spite of upward of 5,000 tips from the public. In June 1997, a bench was dedicated to the women inside the Victim's Memorial Garden in Springfield's Phelps Grove Park.

The case has been featured on shows such as 48 Hours and America's Most Wanted. Investigation Discovery aired "The Springfield Three" on its Disappeared TV series. In 2019, the same channel's People Magazine Investigates featured a tabloid-style episode titled "The Springfield Three".

In 2021, journalist Anne Roderique-Jones launched The Springfield Three: A Small-Town Disappearance podcast.

See also

 
 List of people who disappeared

References

External links
 Springfield Police Department Cold Case
 
 
 

1990s missing person cases
1992 in Missouri
1992 in the United States
June 1992 events in the United States
Kidnappings in the United States
Missing person cases in Missouri
People from Springfield, Missouri
History of Springfield, Missouri
Mass disappearances
Trios
History of women in Missouri